Members of the New South Wales Legislative Council were mostly elected at the 1933 and 1936 elections. A further 15 were elected by a joint sitting of the New South Wales Parliament in November 1939. The President was Sir John Peden.

See also
Mair ministry
First McKell ministry

References

Members of New South Wales parliaments by term
20th-century Australian politicians